Essam is a small town and is the capital of Bia West District, a district in the Western North Region of Ghana.
The people there are mainly Sefwi people and their common language is the Sefwi language.

References

Populated places in the Western North Region